Marenostrum Music Festival is an electronic dance music festival held annually since 2014. The venue is July at Valencia, Spain. Headliners have included Hardwell, Dimitri Vegas & Like Mike, Afrojack, Nervo, Tiësto, Quintino, Mike Marin and Vitale .

Recognition 

Its first edition (2014) was nominated by Vicious Music Awards 2014 and Carlsberg as one of the three best festivals in Spain.

See also 
List of electronic music festivals

References

External links

Music festivals established in 2014
Electronic music festivals in Spain